Dov Yosef Tiefenbach (born December 8, 1981) is a Canadian actor and musician.

Life and career
Tiefenbach was born in Toronto, Ontario, Canada. He is of Jewish background. He began his acting career at the age of 12, starting off in commercials, before playing the role of Josh Avery in the television series RoboCop (1994). He landed his first starring role as Murray Murray in the short film Love Child (1995) alongside actress Neve Campbell.

After those pivotal first projects, Dov was cast as the lead role Nick Burns in the 1996 Broadway production A Thousand Clowns alongside actor Judd Hirsch. After returning to Toronto, his name began circulating as he worked his way further into the film industry, starring in the lead roles of both Little Men and Cheaters. In 2003 he won a Leo Award for Best Supporting Male Performance in Flower & Garnet (2002).

His most recent roles include the reclusive writer Lucky Carroway in the television series This Space for Rent (2006), the troubled young Adrian in the psychological thriller The Dark Hours (2005) and the hippie drug dealer Bradley Thomas in the comedy Harold & Kumar Go to White Castle (2004).

Before he moved to Los Angeles, he was the frontman for the Toronto-based "dirty indie pop" band Theresa's Sound-World (named after a Sonic Youth song).

Filmography

Film

Television

References

External links

Official Movie Trailer for Parasomnia

1981 births
Living people
Male actors from Toronto
Canadian male film actors
Canadian male voice actors
Canadian male television actors
Jewish Canadian male actors